Leak-Chaffin-Browder House is historic home located near Germanton, Stokes County, North Carolina. It was built between about 1853 and 1860, and is a large two-story, Greek Revival style brick dwelling.  It has a Colonial Revival style front porch that dates from the early 20th century.  Also on the property are the contributing kitchen-slave/servants' house, granary / tobacco pack house, wood shed, privy, shed, barn, and combination corn crib, equipment shed, and meat house.

It was added to the National Register of Historic Places in 2002.

References

Houses on the National Register of Historic Places in North Carolina
Greek Revival houses in North Carolina
Colonial Revival architecture in North Carolina
Houses completed in 1853
Houses in Stokes County, North Carolina
National Register of Historic Places in Stokes County, North Carolina
1853 establishments in North Carolina